Joliet Township is one of eighteen townships in Platte County, Nebraska, United States. The population was 130 as of the 2020 census. A 2021 estimate placed the township's population at 128.

History
Joliet Township was originally called Lookingglass Township, and under the latter name was organized in 1873.

See also
County government in Nebraska

References

External links
City-Data.com

Townships in Platte County, Nebraska
Townships in Nebraska